Ski jumping at the 2017 Asian Winter Games was held in Sapporo, Japan between 22 February to 25 February 2017 at the Miyanomori Ski Jump Stadium for the normal hill and Okurayama Ski Jump Stadium for the large hill. A total of three events were contested (all for men); normal hill, large hill and team large hill. Host nation Japan dominated the competition winning all three gold medals.

Schedule

Medalists

Medal table

Participating nations
A total of 17 athletes from 4 nations competed in ski jumping at the 2017 Asian Winter Games:

References

External links
Official website
Official Results Book – Ski Jumping

 
2017 Asian Winter Games events
2017
2017 in ski jumping